Robin Danial Earl (born March 18, 1955) is a former professional American football player, who played as a full back and tight end in the National Football League (NFL). He played seven seasons for the Chicago Bears  and two for the Birmingham Stallions  of the United States Football League (USFL).

High school 
Earl starred as a tailback at Kent-Meridian High School in Kent, Washington, southeast of Seattle, despite his   frame more typical of a lineman or tight-end. In his senior season of 1972, Earl was voted the state's MVP both on offense and defense, and was also named Washington's Top Scholastic Athlete of the Year. That spring he won the state title in the discus, and his toss of  still stands as K-M's all time mark.

College career 
At the University of Washington in Seattle, Earl started as a tight end as a freshman in 1973, but once again he proved valuable when switched to full back for his final two and a half seasons. He lettered all four years and finished as the Huskies' second all-time leading rusher with 2,351 yards. Voted Most Improved Player after the 1974 season, Earl was a team captain and MVP as a senior in 1976. He also lettered 3 years in track & field as a discus thrower, and qualified for the NCAA Track Championships all three seasons

Professional career 
Robin Earl was selected in the third round of the 1977 NFL Draft by the Chicago Bears. He played fullback, blocking for Walter Payton for three years before being switched once again to tight end, then finished his nine-year career with the Birmingham Stallions of the USFL.

After football, Earl licensed in the state of Illinois (1986) as an Insurance Broker specializing in employee benefits. In 2009, Earl licensed with the Illinois Commerce Commission to sell energy and founded 'Save On Energy 81'. His company currently sells electricity to hundreds of Illinois residences and businesses. In 2014 Earl moved back to the Seattle area and joined the 'Assurance Group' specializing in Medicare sales. In November 2021 Earl who is now semi-retired, moved to the Southern Tucson, Az. area where he still maintains his Insurance & Energy Broker's License.

Currently 
Robin has seven children and 8 grandkids. Ryan, Regan, Roth, Robin, Kristin, Preston & Kevin. Resides in a retirement community (Quail Creek) in Green Valley, Arizona.

External links
 

1955 births
Living people
American football running backs
American football tight ends
Chicago Bears players
Washington Huskies football players
Sportspeople from Boise, Idaho
Players of American football from Idaho
Players of American football from Washington (state)
Birmingham Stallions players